Pam Behrens (born September 22, 1946) is an American rower. She competed in the women's coxed four event at the 1976 Summer Olympics.

References

External links
 

1946 births
Living people
American female rowers
Olympic rowers of the United States
Rowers at the 1976 Summer Olympics
Sportspeople from Camden, New Jersey
21st-century American women